"Tokyo Drift (Fast & Furious)" is a single by Japanese hip hop group Teriyaki Boyz. It features on the 2006 film The Fast and the Furious: Tokyo Drift as the main theme and also features at the end credits. The song also appears in the band's second album Serious Japanese.

Background 
The song is written by the band member Verbal, Wise, Ilmari and was produced by the Neptunes (Pharrell Williams and Chad Hugo). The song can also be heard in the 2006 movie when the cars are racing.
On 3 February 2009 from the group's album Serious Japanese, The official remix was released featuring American rappers Pusha T and Fam-Lay with new verses from Teriyaki Boyz.

Reception and legacy 
"Tokyo Drift (Fast & Furious)" has had staying power.  It has been praised as one of the best songs from the Fast & Furious franchise as well as a "badass driving song". In 2020, Time reported on a viral trend of videos that began on TikTok depicting people "drifting" across their hardwood floors. Injury Reserve interpolates the melody in their song, "Jailbreak the Tesla". Indonesian rapper Rich Brian released a "Tokyo Drift Freestyle" during the COVID-19 pandemic that garnered media attention in the United States and Indonesia. American rapper Lil Yachty released "T.D", which heavily samples "Tokyo Drift", featuring Tierra Whack, Tyler, The Creator, and ASAP Rocky.
American rapper Ski Mask The Slump God samples the song as well in "Where's The Blow?" featuring Lil Pump.

Commercial performance 
The song received positive reviews from critics. It was certified Gold by RIAJ, making it Teriyaki Boyz's only certified single to date.

References 

2005 songs
2006 singles
Song recordings produced by the Neptunes
Songs written by Verbal (rapper)
Star Trak Entertainment singles
Fast & Furious music